Evangelista may refer to:

People

Given name
 Evangelista Andreoli (1810–1875) was an Italian organist, pianist, and teacher
 Evangelista Cittadini, Italian Roman Catholic Bishop of Alessano (1542–1549)
 Evangelista da Pian di Meleto (c. 1460–1549), Italian painter of the Renaissance period
 Evangelista Gennaro Gorga (1865–1957), Italian lyric tenor
 Evangelista Martinotti (1634–1694), Italian painter of the Baroque period
 Evangelista Menga (c. 1480–c. 1571), Italian military engineer
 Evangelista Santos (born 1977), Brazilian mixed martial arts fighter
 Evangelista Schiano, Italian painter, mainly of sacred subjects, active in 1755-77
 Evangelista Tornioli, O.S.B. (1570–1630), Italian Roman Catholic Bishop of Città di Castello (1616–1630)
 Evangelista Torricelli (1608–1647), Italian physicist and mathematician
 Fernando Evangelista Iglesias (born 1991), Argentine football defender
 Giovanni Evangelista Draghi (1654–1712), Italian painter
 Giovanni Evangelista Pallotta, (also named Palotta or Palotto (1548–1620), Italian Roman Catholic Cardinal
 Giovanni Evangelista Pelleo, O.F.M. Conv. (died 1595), Italian Roman Catholic Bishop of Sant'Agata de' Goti 
 Jan Evangelista Purkyně (1787–1869), Czech anatomist, patriot, and physiologist
 João Evangelista Belfort Duarte (1883–1918), Brazilian football central defender
 Jucimara Evangelista Dantas (born 1978), Brazilian basketball player
 Juan Evangelista Venegas (c. 1928 – 1980), first Puerto Rican to win an Olympic medal
 Laura Evangelista Alvarado Cardozo, Blessed (1875-1967), Venezuelan Roman Catholic founder of the Augustinian Recollect Sisters of the Heart of Jesus 
 Lucas Evangelista Santana de Oliveira (born 1995), Brazilian professional football central midfielder
 Marcílio Luís Evangelista dos Santos (born 1964), Brazilian former football forward
 Marcos Evangelista de Moraes (born  1970), known as Cafu, Brazilian former professional football defender
 Marcos Evangelista Pérez Jiménez (1914–2001), Venezuelan military and general officer of the Army of Venezuela
 Paulo Afonso Evangelista Vieira (21st century), member of the PMDB of Santa Catarina

Surname
 Adrian Evangelista (born 1989), Filipino contemporary painter and part-time photographer
 Alfredo Evangelista (born 1954), former Uruguayan-Spaniard boxer
 Alfredo E. Evangelista (1926–2008), Filipino archeologist
 Armando Evangelista Macedo Freitas (born 1973), Portuguese football manager and former player 
 Benjamin Evangelista (born 1949), Filipino former cyclist
 Billy Evangelista, American mixed martial arts fighter
 Christine Evangelista (born 1986) is an American actress
 Crisanto Evangelista (1888–1943), Filipino Communist politician and labor leader
 Daniella Evangelista (born 1982), Canadian actress and model
 David Evangelista (21st century), fashion journalist
 Diego Evangelista dos Santos (born 1989), Brazilian footballer 
 Ed Evangelista (21st century), judge for the first season of ABC's reality television show American Inventor
 Edilberto Evangelista (1862–1897), Filipino civil engineer and revolutionary
 Frankie Evangelista (1934–2004), Filipino radio and television broadcaster of ABS-CBN since 1953
 Heart Evangelista (born 1985), Filipino actress, singer, model, and VJ
 Irineu Evangelista de Sousa, Viscount of Mauá (1813–1889) 
 Jeyow Evangelista, Filipino filmmaker, cinematographer, and film director
 Johannes Evangelista Gossner (1773-1858), German divine and philanthropist
 José Evangelista (1943–2023), Spanish composer and music educator 
 Larissa Evangelista (born 1988), Brazilian group rhythmic gymnast
 Linda Evangelista (born 1965), Canadian supermodel
 Lucy Evangelista (born 1986), 2005 Miss Northern Ireland
 Nick Evangelista (born 1949), fencing master, author, and magazine publisher
 Patricia Evangelista, Filipino journalist and documentary filmmaker 
 Paulo Afonso Evangelista Vieira, Brazilian federal deputy and member of the PMDB of Santa Catarina
 Rey Evangelista (born 1971), Filipino former professional basketball player 
 Reynaldo G. Evangelista, OFS, DD, Filipino Roman Catholic bishop of Imus
 Romeu Evangelista (born 1950), also known as Romeu Cambalhota, former Brazilian footballer
 Stefanie Evangelista (born 1989), beauty pageant titleholder
 Tony Evangelista (born 1945), Canadian FIFA referee

See also
 Evangelist (disambiguation)
 Evangelistas Islets, a group of four islands that come under the jurisdiction of the Chilean Navy
 Evangelisti, a surname
 Italian submarine Evangelista Torricelli, a list of ships
 

Italian feminine given names
Occupational surnames